Berthouville is a commune in the Eure department in Normandy in northern France.

Population

Sights
The Manoir de Berthouville is a hunting lodge that was built 1652. It is privately owned.

See also
Communes of the Eure department

References

Communes of Eure